Mary A. Parry (16 October 1929 – 3 March 2017) was a British figure skater who competed in ice dancing. With partner Roy Mason, she won bronze at the 1960 European Championships in Garmisch-Partenkirchen, West Germany. Parry and Mason were both members of Birmingham Ice Dance Club and had started competing together by 1955.

Parry served as an ice dancing judge at the 1994 Winter Olympics. In her final years, she lived with Mason in Sutton Coldfield.

Competitive highlights 
With Roy Mason

References 

1929 births
2017 deaths
English female ice dancers
Figure skating judges
Sportspeople from Birmingham, West Midlands
British women referees and umpires